Henry Dean may refer to:

 Henry Clay Dean (1822–1887), U.S. 19th century anti-war activist and clergyman
 H. Trendley Dean (1893–1962), American dentist
 Henry Roy Dean (1879–1961), professor of pathology

See also
 Harry Dean (disambiguation)
 Henry Deane (disambiguation)